Jacques Moliner (born 24 January 1967), is a French former professional rugby league footballer who played in the 1980s. His lone appearance was for the Penrith Panthers in 1987. His son Cyril plays for the St Gaudens Bears. He made his first steps in rugby league in Vernajoul, which also produced names such as Claude Sirvent, Lilian Hébert and Christophe Moly.
He was the first French player to play rugby league in Australia.

References

1967 births
Living people
French rugby league players
France national rugby league team players
Lézignan Sangliers players
XIII Catalan players
Penrith Panthers players